Yamazaki-Teiichi Prize is an award given annually by the Foundation for Promotion of Material Science and Technology of Japan (MST) to people who have achieved outstanding, creative results, with practical effect, by publishing theses, acquiring patents, or developing methods, technologies and the like and/or people with strong future potential for achieving such results. Chairman of the selection committee is Professor Hideki Shirakawa, the winner of the 2000 Nobel Prize in chemistry. The prize was established in commemoration of the late , the first chairman of the MST's Board of Directors, for his contributions to scientific, technological and industrial development and human resource cultivation.

Fields
The Yamazaki-Teiichi Prize is awarded in the following four fields. Prizewinner receives an award diploma, a gold medal, and cash award of JPY 3,000,000 cash (about USD 30 thousands) per full Prize in each area.
Materials 
Semiconductors & semiconductor devices 
Measurement science & technology 
Biological science & technology

Awards

Materials
2001 - Takaaki Toyooka. Next generation, electrical resistance welded steel tube with high strength and excellent formability contributing to energy conservation.
2002 - Syunichi Miyazaki. Development of Ti-Ni shape memory alloys and contribution to their applications.
2003 - Toshihiro Ishikawa. Development and industrialization of functional ceramics produced from an organosilicon polymer.
2004 - Hirohisa Tanaka, Mari Uenishi, Yasuo Nishihata. Research and development of a self-regenerative palladium-perovskite catalyst for automotive emissions control.
2005 - . Study on the application of tunnel magnetoresistance junctions.
2006 - Kazuhito Hashimoto, . Environmental materials using TiO2 photocatalyst with solar energy.
2007 - Masashi Kawasaki. Exploration of ZnO based semiconductor technology.
2008 - Terunori Fujita, Makoto Mitani. Development of new olefin polymerization catalysts and their applications to novel polyolefinic materials.
2009 - , Hiroyasu Fujimori. Development and industrial contribution of amorphous alloys.
2010 - , Koji Nozaki. Technical innovation in ArF resist material for LSI production to 90nm-era and beyond.
2011 - Akira Yoshino. Development and its commercialization of the lithium-ion battery.
2012 - Yoshinobu Honkura. The research and development of Dy free Nd-Fe-B anisotropic bonded magnet and its applications to motors.
2013 - Hiroshi Harada, Kyoko Kawagishi, Tadaharu Yokokawa. Development of high temperature turbine material using nickel-based superalloys.
2014 - Takatomo Sasaki, Yusuke Mori, Masashi Yoshimura. Discovery of nonlinear optical borate crystal CsLiB6O10 and contributions to development of new deep-ultraviolet laser sources.
2015 - Fujimitsu Masuyama, Atsuro Iseda. Contribution to the development and application of creep-strength-enhanced ferritic heat resistant steels and highly efficient power plant operation.
2016 - Akira Yoshikawa, Kei Kamada, Yasuhiro Shoji. Developments of a novel garnet scintillators and industrialization by the academic startups.

Semiconductors & semiconductor devices
2001 - . Pioneer work for high-quality epitaxial growth of semiconductor silicon carbide and power devices.
2002 - Tatau Nishinaga. Invention of micro-channel epitaxy for drastic reduction of dislocation in highly lattice-mismatched hetero-epitaxial systems.
2003 - Jyunichi Murota. Development of group IV hetero CVD technology and creation of atomically controlled processing.
2004 - Kazutoshi Wakabayashi. High-level synthesis and verification on system LSI.
2005 - Mitsuo Usami, Ryo Imura. Development of ultra-small chip for IC tags and related technology.
2006 - Takashi Ito. Advanced research for highly-reliable CMOS gate dielectric films by direct nitridation of silicon.
2007 - Hiroshi Iwai, Hisayo S. Momose, Tatsuya Ohguro. Pioneering work of sub-50 nm MOSFET research and development.
2008 - Masaru Sasago. A pioneer research and industrial development of excimer laser lithography technology.
2009 - Yoshinobu Nakagome, Masashi Horiguchi, Takayuki Kawahara. Pioneering development of seminal low-leakage CMOS circuits.
2010 - Hiroo Kinoshita. Pioneering research and longtime contribution for industrial approach on extreme ultraviolet lithography.
2011 - Digh Hisamoto. Invention and development of "fin" structure MOSFETs.
2012 - Shinichi Takagi. Pioneering contributions to understanding of carrier transport properties in channels of Si MOSFETs and to technology of the channel mobility enhancement.
2013 - Nobukazu Teranishi. Development of image sensors with pinned photodiode.
2014 - Takashi Eshita, Shoichiro Kawashima, Shigeo Kashiwagi. Development of high-reliability technologies for ferroelectric random access memory and its mass-production.
2015 - Hidefumi Ibe, Tadanobu Toba, Kenichi Shinbo. Development of impact assessment technologies for terrestrial neutron-induced soft-errors in semiconductor devices and prompt protection architecture against resultant failures in electronic systems.
2016 - Mitsuru Sugawara, Keizo Takemasa, Kenichi Nishi. Realization of superior characteristic quantum dot lasers with optical communication wavelength and its commercialization with mass-production.

Measurement science & technology
2001 - Mitsuhiro Katayama. Development of coaxial impact-collision ion scattering spectroscopy and its application to in situ topmost surface analysis.
2002 - . Development of highly sensitive micro magnetic sensor using amorphous wire: magneto-impedance sensor.
2003 - Masashi Iwatsuki. Development of variable temperature SPM (scanning probe microscope).
2004 - Reiko Kuroda. Development and application of universal chiroptical spectrophotometer (UCS).
2005 - . Development and application of spin-polarized scanning electron microscope.
2006 - Yuji Miyahara, Toshiya Sakata. Electrical detection of biomolecular recognition using genetic field effect transistor and its application to genetic analyses.
2007 - Takeshi Hasegawa. Development of multiple-angle incidence resolution spectrometry and application to analysis of molecular structure in ultrathin films.
2008 - Kazushi Yamanaka. Development of ball surface acoustic wave sensor (ball SAW sensor).
2009 - Yasuaki Takada, Masuyoshi Yamada, Yuichiro Hashimoto. Real time mass spectrometry for secure society.
2010 - Toshio Ando. Development of high-speed atomic force microscope and its application to dynamic observation of biomolecules.
2011 - Tutomu Nakanishi, Yoshikazu Takeda, Takanori Koshikawa. Development and application of spin-polarized low energy electron microscope for dynamic observation of magnetic domains.
2012 - Michio Tajima. Development and standardization of semiconductor characterization technique using photoluminescence.
2013 - Hiroyuki Fujita, Hiroyuki Noji, Gen Hashiguchi. Development of micromachine technology for bio-nano characterization.
2014 - Tsutomu Masujima. Development of nano-mass spectrometry for a live single cell and organelle and its application to drug discovery and biomedical sciences.
2015 - Hideyuki Takahashi, Masami Terauchi, Masato Koike. Development of soft X-ray spectrometer dedicated to electron microbeam analysis for versatile practical application.
2017 - .

Biological science & technology
2001 - Kazuhiko Kinoshita. Development of the technology for the direct observation of dynamic motion of a single living molecule.
2002 - Tetsuo Nagano. Development of novel and practical bioimaging Probes.
2003 - Yaeta Endo. Establishment of cell-free protein synthesis system for practical usage.
2004 - Atushi Miyawaki. The multidisciplinary innovations in fluorescence imaging.
2005 - . Structural and functional study of membrane proteins.
2006 - Keiko Shimamoto. Study of excitatory neurotransmission system based on novel molecular probes.
2007 - Piero Carninci. Development of the cap-trapper, a fundamental technology to isolate full-length cDNAs and annotate the genome function.
2008 - Shinya Yamanaka. Identification of factors that induced and maintain pluripotency.
2009 - , Akihiko Kikuchi, Masayuki Yamato. Creation of cell sheet engineering based on intelligent surfaces.
2010 - . Development of novel animal reproduction technology.
2011 - Chikashi Toyoshima. Development of a crystallization method utilizing phospholipids and elucidation of the mechanism of calcium pump.
2012 - Yoshiki Sasai. Three-dimensional formation of brain and sensory tissues from pluripotent stem cells by self-organization.
2013 - , Seigo Sawada, . Irinotecan hydrochloride: the first established anticancer agent as camptothecin derivatives.
2014 - . Design and synthesis of opioid receptor type selective ligands and their application to drugs.
2015 - Hiroki Ueda. The realization of whole-body analysis with single-cell resolution by whole-body clearing technology.

Related news releases
 2006: Suntory Institute for Bioorganic Research TOPICS Keiko Shimamoto received 6th Yamazaki-Teiichi Prize (in Japanese)
 2007: Tokyo Institute of Technology - Prof. Hiroshi Iwai received an award of Yamazaki-Teiichi Prize with Dr. Hisayo Momose and Mr. Tatsuya Ohguro of Toshiba Corporation. Album
 2007: RIKEN NEWS Yamazaki-Teiichi Prizes awarded to two RIKEN scientists
 2008: Kyoto University - Center for iPS Cell Research and Application NEWS ROOM, Prof. Shinya Yamanaka recognized with Yamazaki-Teiichi Prize press release (in Japanese)
 2008: Tohoku University - New Industry Creation Hatchery Center NEWS Professor Kazushi Yamanaka received the 8th Yamazaki-Teiichi Prize

References

External links
 Nomination Details for The Yamazaki-Teiichi Prize
 Winners: Material, Semiconductor & Semiconductor Device, Measurement Science & Technology, Biological Science & Technology
 Past winners

Japanese science and technology awards